Riccall is a village and civil parish situated in the Selby District of North Yorkshire, England, lying  to the north of Selby and  south of York.

It was historically part of the East Riding of Yorkshire until 1974.

According to the 2011 census the parish had a total population of 2,332.

Governance
Riccall is a major part of the electoral ward called Riccall with Escrick. The total population of this ward at the 2011 census was 4,312.

Geology and geography
The settlement of Riccall lies on the Humberhead Levels. At the end of the last ice age about 10,000 years ago Riccall lay underneath the very large Glacial Lake Humber. This gives the area its characteristic light sandy soil. Riccall is the starting point of the ten kilometre Cycle the Solar System route which follows the Selby−York cycle track finishing in Dringhouses, York. The cycle track used to form the old route of the East Coast Main Line via Selby, and Riccall station served the village until 1964.

History

Homo sapiens first arrived in Great Britain around 12,000 years ago as the earth was warming before the beginning of the Holocene era. It is not known when Man first arrived in the area, however there is evidence that the Humberhead Levels have been settled for several thousand years, and that the drier northern area where Riccall is situated was settled before the Roman era.

Saxons and Danes
The village was the site of an Anglo-Saxon settlement and there is evidence of a Saxon church on the site of the current St Mary's. The early settlers most likely chose the site because of two geographical factors: the area forms a slightly raised plateau above a flood plain, and it is near the Ouse.

Riccall was the site of the base camp of Harald Hardrada in 1066. He landed on the banks of the Ouse after sailing up the Humber Estuary and set up camp at Riccall before his victory in the Battle of Fulford. However this was to be his last taste of victory, as his army was defeated shortly afterwards by the forces of King Harold Godwinson of England with the false parlay and preceding battle at Stamford Bridge, with many of his troops back at the base camp the battle was short and Hardrada himself died. This battle had a knock-on effect as it distracted Harold from the defence of the south coast and left the land open to Norman invasion. The event is commemorated in one of Riccall's streets, now a footpath, named after Olaf who looked after the camp in Harald's absence, and in Danes Hills, so named for its tumuli. There is now a small information panel about the event at the bottom of Landing Lane, approximately where the Danes moored.

Normans

The old south door of the church has a carved Romanesque arch and its 12th-century three-stage tower has Norman double window openings.

Riccall Mine

Between 1983 and 2004 the village was home to UK Coal's Riccall Mine which was part of the Selby Coalfield. The colliery, located south-east of Riccall, closed in 2004. The site of the colliery was re-developed as a business park.

Community

The village has a primary school, post office, NISA store, hairdresser/beauty salon, butcher, two pubs, an Italian restaurant and the Regen Centre, an award-winning conference, events, and community facility. The Regen Centre houses a bar, four outdoor tennis courts, and a small sports hall where football and badminton can be played.  

Villagers are kept up to date with local news via bimonthly editions of Riccall News. Places to stay include The Park View, South Newlands Farm, The White Rose Villa and Dairymans Cottage B&B which has twice won the certificate of excellence from TripAdvisor.

References

External links

, Riccall Business Park, formerly Riccall colliery, map location
Regen Centre website
Riccall Parish Council website
Riccall United Football Club website

Civil parishes in North Yorkshire
Selby District
Villages in North Yorkshire